Remote Radar Head Brizlee Wood (or RRH Brizlee Wood), is an air defence radar station operated by the Royal Air Force located at Brizlee Wood, near Alnwick in Northumberland, England. Originally opened as an Ace High site in the early 1960s, it now forms part of the Air Surveillance and Control System (ASACS) of the Royal Air Force.

History
The site was one of the original Ace High sites dotted throughout Europe and into Asia. Ace High was a NATO communication system which stretched from Norway to Turkey. Brizlee Wood was one of five sites in the United Kingdom, and was equipped with four  dishes. In November 1990 when the Ace High network was superseded, it was confirmed the site would  close in early 1991. The site was later converted into an RAF radar facility and was equipped with a Type 93 radar.

In 2008, it was reported that BAE Systems had won a contract to supply new radar equipment which would combat the effects of windfarms on the radar tracking stations. The beam which is bounced back into radar stations can have a "shadow" caused by windfarms causing confused or non-existent signals. However, by 2012, it was further reported that a £45 million deal had been struck with SERCO instead. The placement of windfarms near to remote radar heads (RRH) has raised several objections by the MoD. Studies have shown that aircraft flying over windfarms appear "invisible" no matter what they are flying at, nor that distance from the RRH. Several proposed windfarms in the Northumberland area have been objected to by the MoD because of suggested interference with the Air Defence (AD) radar at RRH Brizlee Wood. The trialling of updated radars was successful at RRH Trimingham, so the MoD bought more of the TPS-77 radars to install at RRH Staxton Wold and Brizlee Wood. The radar installed at Brizlee Wood allowed the 48 tower windfarm at Fallago Rig to go ahead.

During 2020 under Project Hydra, the radome was taken down whilst the site received an upgrade. Project Hydra also upgraded the RRH stations at Benbecula and Buchan. The area the base is located in recorded the strongest winds during Storm Arwen in November 2021. The technology at the site will be upgraded, along with other radar stations, under Project Guardian, a new £80 million air defence programme.

Notes

References

Sources

External links
Webpage with images of Brizlee Wood as an Ace High site

Radar stations
Royal Air Force stations in Northumberland